The 2016 Bangladesh Championship League  was 5th season of the Bangladesh Championship League since its establishment. A total of 8 teams competed in the league. The league begun on 10 October 2016.

Uttar Baridhara SC were the defending champions, having won their Bangladesh Championship League title the previous seasons.

Standings

Rank	 Teams	Played	Wins	Draw	Lost	GD	Points
 
1	Fakirapool YMC (15-16)	14	7	6	1	15 - 8	7	27  

2	Saif Sporting Club (15-16)	14	6	8	0	19 - 10	9	26  

3	Agrani Bank SC (15-16)	14	6	2	6	13 - 14	-1	20  

4	Bangladesh Police Athletic Club (15-16)	14	4	6	4	11 - 9	2	18  

5	T&T Club (15-16)	14	4	5	5	14 - 14	0	17  

6	Victoria SC (15-16)	14	3	5	6	14 - 16	-2	14  

7	Kawran Bazar (15-16)	14	2	8	4	7 - 12	-5	14  

8	Chittagong Mohammedan (15-16)	14	2	4	8	13 - 23	-10	10    

Bangladesh Championship League seasons
2015–16 in Asian association football leagues
2016 in Bangladeshi football